Elachista deresyensis is a moth of the family Elachistidae. It was described by Traugott-Olsen in 1988. It is found in Turkey.

References

 "Elachista deresyensis Traugott-Olsen". Insecta.pro. Retrieved February 5, 2020.

Moths described in 1988
deresyensis
Moths of Asia